The 1929 Victorian Football Association season was the 51st season of the Australian rules football competition. The premiership was won by the Northcote Football Club, after it defeated Port Melbourne by 42 points in the Grand Final on 12 October. It was the club's first VFA premiership.

Association membership 
In November 1928, the Oakleigh Football Club applied to join the Association. Oakleigh had been a successful club in the Sub-District Association, had a good quality ground, the growing suburb of Oakleigh provided the team strong support, and the club had been previously considered for Association membership. Oakleigh's application was accepted unanimously.

In February 1929, the Sandringham council applied to the Association to establish a local senior team in the competition. The Association approved the application, subject to the council receiving permission from the Minister for Lands to erect a fence around its home ground, Beach Park, which it received on 22 February; the council had been refused permission to erect the same fence by the previous Minister for Lands in late 1927, which was one of the reasons why an application to join the Association was rejected the previous year. The Sandringham Football Club was established as a new club representing the district, and entered the Association.

The two new clubs brought the size of the Association to twelve clubs – the largest it had been since 1896. This was the last change to the Association membership until 1951.

Premiership 
To accommodate a balanced fixture with the two extra clubs, the home-and-home season was extended from eighteen matches to twenty-two matches, the longest it had been since fixed-length seasons were first introduced in 1894. Then, the top four clubs contested a finals series under the amended Argus system to determine the premiers for the season.

Ladder

Finals

Awards 
 Leo McInerney (Brunswick) was the leading goalkicker, with 88 goals in the home-and-home season and 92 goals overall.
 Ted Bourke (Sandringham) won the Recorder Cup as the Association's best and fairest, polling nine votes. W. Brown (Yarraville) finished second with eight votes, and C. Irwin (Brighton) finished third with seven votes.
 Coburg won the seconds premiership. Coburg 14.16 (100) defeated Williamstown 14.7 (91) at the Oakleigh Cricket Ground on 28 September.

Notable events 
 J. J. Liston, president and delegate of the Williamstown Football Club, was elected president of the Association at the annual general meeting in February 1929, replacing long-serving president John Aikman, who had died in 1928. Liston served in the position until his death in 1944.

External links 
 List of VFA premiers

References 

Victorian Football League seasons
VFL